Plicofollis is a genus of sea catfishes found along the coasts of the Indian Ocean from Africa to Australasia with some species ranging up into the Philippines. They occur in marine, brackish and fresh waters. There are currently eight described species in this genus.

Species
 Plicofollis argyropleuron (Valenciennes, 1840) (longsnouted catfish)
 Plicofollis dussumieri (Valenciennes, 1840) (blacktip sea-catfish)
 Plicofollis magatensis (Herre, 1926)
 Plicofollis nella (Valenciennes, 1840) (smooth-headed catfish)
 Plicofollis platystomus (F. Day, 1877) (flatmouth sea-catfish)
 Plicofollis polystaphylodon (Bleeker, 1846) (Mozambique sea-catfish)
 Plicofollis tenuispinis (F. Day, 1877) (thinspine sea-catfish)
 Plicofollis tonggol (Bleeker, 1846) (roughback sea-catfish)

References
 

Ariidae
Catfish genera
Taxa named by Patricia J. Kailola